The Utah Transportation Commission serves as an independent advisory committee within the State of Utah, United States with the responsibility of deciding how available transportation funds are spent and prioritizing transportation projects within the state. Members of the commission are appointed by the governor. With limited funds available, the commission is tasked with making difficult priority decisions. The commission also advises the Utah Department of Transportation (UDOT) on transportation systems policy. The commission coordinates directly with the executive director of UDOT.

References

Transportation